Bulbophyllum reptans is a species of orchid in the genus Bulbophyllum.

B. reptans contains the phenanthrenediol gymnopusin (2,7-dihydroxy-3,4,9-trimethoxyphenanthrene), the phenanthrenes confusarin (2,7-dihydroxy-3,4,8-trimethoxyphenanthrene), 2,7-dihydroxy-3,4,6-trimethoxyphenanthrene and its 9,10-dihydro derivative, flavanthrinin (2,7-dihydroxy-4-methoxyphenanthrene) and its 9,10-dihydro derivative (coelonin), 3,3′-dihydroxy-5-methoxybibenzyl (batatasin-III), cirrhopetalanthrin (2,2′,7,7′-tetrahydroxy-4,4′-dimethoxy-1,1′-biphenanthryl), its 9,9′,10,10′-tetrahydro derivative (flavanthrin) and the dimeric phenanthrenes reptanthrin and isoreptanthrin.

References 

 The Bulbophyllum-Checklist
 The Internet Orchid Species Photo Encyclopedia

reptans